Gimonde is a civil parish in the municipality of Bragança, Portugal. The population in 2011 was 341, in an area of 16.50 km2.

References

External links
gimonde.pt

Parishes of Bragança, Portugal